Soluch may refer to:

Soluch Airfield, Benina, Libya
Soluch concentration camp, Suluq, Libya
 An alternative spelleling of Suluq
Soluch, a character from the 1979 Iranian book translated as Missing Soluch